Novotroitskoye is a rural locality (a village) and the administrative centre of Novotroitsky Selsoviet, Mishkinsky District, Bashkortostan, Russia. The population was 450 as of 2010. There are 8 streets.

Geography 
Novotroitskoye is located 33 km northeast of Mishkino (the district's administrative centre) by road. Refandy is the nearest rural locality.

References 

Rural localities in Mishkinsky District